The Breda Ba.39, a touring and liaison aircraft designed and built in Italy, was a scaled-up version of the Breda Ba.33, achieving some success in sporting events, and distance flights.

Operational history
The Italian air ministry ordered 60 Ba.39s, one of which was flown on a circuit of the Mediterranean Sea by Folonari and Malinverni, starting and finishing at Turin.

Paraguay
One Ba.39 was registered in Paraguay as ZP-PAA in early 1940, owned by Elías Navarro and Antonio Soljancic. Powered by a Colombo S.63 engine, it was used for express flights by a company called Navarro Expreso Aéreo. In October, 1940, this plane was destroyed in an accident near São Paulo, Brazil.

Variants

Ba.39
The standard two-seat touring and liaison aircraft
Ba.39S
Tandem three-seat touring, communications aircraft introduced in 1934.
Ba.39 Met

Ba.39 Col

Ba.42
In 1934 the Ba.42 was introduced powered by a  Fiat A.70S radial engine, with a NACA cowling.

Operators

Regia Aeronautica
Italian Co-Belligerent Air Force

Specifications (Ba.39)

See also

References

 
 Sapienza Fracchia, Antonio Luis: "La Contribución Italiana en la Aviación Paraguaya". Author's edition. Asunción, 2007. 300pp.

External links

Ba.039
Low-wing aircraft
Single-engined tractor aircraft
Aircraft first flown in 1932